The Tzitzeica equation is a nonlinear partial differential equation devised by Gheorghe Țițeica in 1907 in the study of differential geometry, describing surfaces of constant affine curvature. The Tzitzeica equation has also been used in nonlinear physics, being an integrable 1+1 dimensional Lorentz invariant system.

On substituting

the equation becomes

.

One obtains the traveling solution of the original equation by the reverse transformation .

References

Further reading

Eryk Infeld and George Rowlands,Nonlinear Waves,Solitons and Chaos,Cambridge 2000
Saber Elaydi,An Introduction to Difference Equationns, Springer 2000
Dongming Wang, Elimination Practice,Imperial College Press 2004
David Betounes, Partial Differential Equations for Computational Science: With Maple and Vector Analysis Springer, 1998 
George Articolo Partial Differential Equations & Boundary Value Problems with Maple V Academic Press 1998 

Nonlinear partial differential equations